Firebaugh is a city in Fresno County, California, United States, on the west side of the San Joaquin River 38 miles (61 km) west of Fresno.

State Route 33 (SR 33) and the San Joaquin Valley Railroad, West Side Subdivision, pass through downtown. A small commercial district features the ubiquitous California Central Valley water tank painted with the city's name.

Firebaugh lies at an elevation of 151 feet (46 m). The population was 7,549 at the 2010 census, up from 5,743 as of 2000.

Firebaugh hosts an annual Cantaloupe Round-Up Festival in Dunkle Park. The event aims at celebrating the peak harvest of the melon in late July and is an economic boost for local businesses.

History

The city, formerly Firebaugh's Ferry, is named for Andrew D. Firebaugh (also spelled Fierbaugh, born in Virginia in 1823), an area entrepreneur. During the Gold Rush, Firebaugh's most famous local enterprise was a ferry boat which shuttled people across the San Joaquin River. In 1857, he built a toll road for wagons, replacing an earlier horse trail that ran parallel to present-day State Route 152 from what became Bell Station over Pacheco Pass to the Rancho San Luis Gonzaga.

Firebaugh was a station on the Butterfield Overland Stage. The Firebaugh's Ferry post office operated from 1860 to 1862. The Firebaugh post office opened in 1865.

In the 1880s, the area of Firebaugh was once part of the massive holdings of the Miller and Lux Company, which had a large cattle operation covering what today is Dos Palos to Mendota.

The city incorporated in 1914.

Geography

Climate
According to the Köppen Climate Classification system, Firebaugh has a semi-arid climate, abbreviated "BSk" on climate maps.

Demographics

2010
At the 2010 census Firebaugh had a population of 7,549. The racial makeup of Firebaugh was 4,715 (62.5%) White, 70 (0.9%) African American, 116 (1.5%) Native American, 40 (0.5%) Asian, 0 (0.0%) Pacific Islander, 2,371 (31.4%) from other races, and 237 (3.1%) from two or more races. Hispanic or Latino of any race were 6,887 persons (91.2%).

The census reported that 7,536 people (99.8% of the population) lived in households, 13 (0.2%) lived in non-institutionalized group quarters, and no one was institutionalized.

There were 1,920 households, 1,208 (62.9%) had children under the age of 18 living in them, 1,179 (61.4%) were opposite-sex married couples living together, 317 (16.5%) had a female householder with no husband present, 182 (9.5%) had a male householder with no wife present.  There were 145 (7.6%) unmarried opposite-sex partnerships, and 6 (0.3%) same-sex married couples or partnerships. 197 households (10.3%) were one person and 95 (4.9%) had someone living alone who was 65 or older. The average household size was 3.93.  There were 1,678 families (87.4% of households); the average family size was 4.17.

The age distribution was 2,716 people (36.0%) under the age of 18, 914 people (12.1%) aged 18 to 24, 1,923 people (25.5%) aged 25 to 44, 1,504 people (19.9%) aged 45 to 64, and 492 people (6.5%) who were 65 or older.  The median age was 26.4 years. For every 100 females, there were 106.3 males.  For every 100 females age 18 and over, there were 104.4 males.

The homeowner vacancy rate was 1.6%; the rental vacancy rate was 3.6%.  4,105 people (54.4% of the population) lived in owner-occupied housing units and 3,431 people (45.4%) lived in rental housing units.

2000
At the 2000 census there were 5,743 people in 1,418 households, including 1,246 families, in the city. The racial makeup of the city was 43.60% White, 1.15% Black or African American, 1.36% Native American, 0.87% Asian, 0.02% Pacific Islander, 48.51% from other races, and 4.49% from two or more races.  87.52% of the population were Hispanic or Latino of any race.
Of the 1,418 households, 59.5% had children under the age of 18 living with them, 66.4% were married couples living together, 14.7% had a female householder with no husband present, and 12.1% were non-families. 9.4% of households were one person and 4.9% were one person aged 65 or older.  The average household size was 4.01 and the average family size was 4.28.

The age distribution was 39.3% under the age of 18, 10.8% from 18 to 24, 28.7% from 25 to 44, 14.7% from 45 to 64, and 6.4% 65 or older.  The median age was 25 years. For every 100 females, there were 108.3 males.  For every 100 females age 18 and over, there were 105.7 males.

The median household income was $31,533 and the median family income was $33,018. Males had a median income of $24,213 versus $17,829 for females. The per capita income for the city was $9,290. About 20.0% of families and 22.5% of the population were below the poverty line, including 27.9% of those under age 18 and 24.3% of those age 65 or over.

Education 
Firebaugh is served by the Firebaugh-Las Deltas Unified School District, which has a preschool, primary school, elementary school, middle school (Firebaugh Middle), and high school (Firebaugh High), in addition to an alternative community education institution called El Puente High School. Firebaugh High School offers the most Regional Occupational Program classes in Fresno County and is also notable for its high AP exam pass rates. Its sports teams are nicknamed the "Eagles".

Notable residents
Josh Allen, NFL quarterback for the Buffalo Bills

In popular culture
On their 1985 album Wönderful, the Circle Jerks, an influential Los Angeles-based punk band, recorded a song titled "Firebaugh". The song's lyrics portray a dystopian vision of racial tension, violence, alcoholism, and boredom. Listeners are warned, "If your car breaks down, don't take a tow to Firebaugh..."
Wells Fargo, one of the major banks in California, periodically runs television commercials set in late 19th-century California and featuring their trademark stage coach. "Firebaugh's Ferry" is sometimes listed as a stagecoach stop.
The video for the 1999 single "The Greatest" by Kenny Rogers was filmed at the baseball field known as "dunkle field" in Firebaugh. Many of the spectators featured in the video were residents from Firebaugh.
 Firebaugh is mentioned in Bruce Springsteen's song "The New Timer", from the album Ghost of Tom Joad, 1995.  The song tells the tale of a hobo and itinerant worker during the Great Depression showing a young man how to survive on the road.  "I hoed sugar beets outside of Firebaugh, I picked the peaches from the Marysville tree.  They bunked us in a barn just like animals.  Me and a hundred others just like me."

References

External links

Incorporated cities and towns in California
Cities in Fresno County, California
1914 establishments in California
Populated places established in 1914
Stagecoach stops in the United States
Butterfield Overland Mail in California